Leduc may refer to:

People
 Albert Leduc (1902–1990), ice hockey player
 Alexandre Leduc (born 1984), Canadian politician
 Amand Leduc (1764–1832), French Navy officer
 Amanda Leduc, Canadian writer
 Jos LeDuc (1944–1999), professional wrestler
 Noella Leduc (1933–2014), All-American Girls Professional Baseball League player
 Ozias Leduc (1864–1955), Canadian painter
 Renato Leduc (1897–1986), Mexican poet and journalist
 René Leduc (1898–1968), the designer of the world's first ramjet-powered aircraft
 Richard Leduc (born 1941), actor
 Simon Le Duc or Leduc (1742–1777), French violinist and composer
 Stéphane Leduc (1853–1939), French biologist
 Timothy LeDuc (born 1990), American pairskater
 Violette Leduc (1907–1972), French author
 Dave Leduc (born 1991), professional fighter
 William Gates LeDuc (1823–1917), American soldier, farmer and lawyer

Places
Leduc, Alberta, a city in Alberta, Canada
Leduc County, a municipal district in Alberta, Canada
Leduc, Missouri, a ghost town in the United States

Other
Éditions Alphonse Leduc, a French music publisher
Leduc experimental aircraft
Leduc No. 1, the oil well strike that started Alberta's main oil boom, near Devon, Alberta
Leduc Formation, a stratigraphical unit in the Western Canadian Sedimentary Basin
William G. LeDuc House, historic house in Hastings, Minnesota